Bhaurao Dagadurao Deshmukh (born 29 December 1922) was an Indian politician who was a member of the 3rd and 4th Lok Sabha, representing the Aurangabad constituency of Maharashtra. He was a member of the Indian National Congress (INC) party.

Deshmukh was born on 29 December 1922. He studied law at Osmania University at Hyderabad. Deshmukh was married to Shashikala and had 4 sons and 3 daughters. He resided at Bhokharden in then Auragabad district.

Deshmukh was member of Hyderabad State Assembly from 1952 to 1956, and a member of the Bombay State Assembly in 1956.

References

External links
 Official biographical sketch in Parliament of India website

1922 births
Possibly living people
India MPs 1962–1967
India MPs 1967–1970
Lok Sabha members from Maharashtra
Marathi politicians
People from Aurangabad, Maharashtra
People from Jalna district
People from Marathwada
Indian National Congress politicians from Maharashtra